{{DISPLAYTITLE:C16H13ClN2O2}}
The molecular formula C16H13ClN2O2 (molar mass: 300.74 g/mol, exact mass: 300.0666 u) may refer to:

 Clobazam
 Temazepam

Molecular formulas